Association Sportive de Cannes Football (commonly referred to as AS Cannes or simply Cannes) is a French association football club based in Cannes. The club was formed 1902 as a sports club and currently plays in the Championnat National 3, the fifth division of French football. Cannes plays its home matches at the Stade Pierre de Coubertin, located within the city. The team is managed by Ludovic Pollet.

Despite playing football on the French Riviera, a popular and relaxing tourist destination, Cannes have had a lackluster existence. The club was one of the founding members of the first division of French football and finished runners-up in the league's inaugural season. The club's highest honour to date was winning the Coupe de France in 1932. Cannes last played in Ligue 1 in the 1997–98 season and are currently serving the longest stint of any club in the National division, having been in the league since the 2001–02 season. The club has most notably served as a springboard for several prominent French football players such as Zinedine Zidane, Patrick Vieira, Johan Micoud, Gaël Clichy, Sébastien Frey and Jonathan Zebina.

Cannes is known as Les Dragons (The Dragons) and incorporates the nickname into a multitude of club's fixtures, most notably its crest. On 21 May 2010, the club unveiled its new logo to its supporters. The new logo is similar to the club's previous logo, but is more dynamic with the club's city name and foundation being displayed on the badge. The dragon, which is a focal point of the club, is also given a more up-to-date design.

History 

Association Sportive de Cannes was founded on 4 August 1902 by English sportsman Herbert Lowe and a group of friends. Lowe was installed as the club's president. During the infancy of the club, in addition to association football, Cannes also practised the sports of competitive swimming and athletics. The club also wore a black and blue combination kit before switching to its current red and white stripe following the club's merger with Club Sportif de Cannes in 1905. Under the leadership of Louis Grosso, a local furniture dealer, the football section developed its structures. In 1920, Cannes were playing in the Ligue du Sud-Est, a regional league under the watch of the French Football Federation (FFF). While playing in the league, Cannes developed rivalries with Nice and Marseille. Nice and Cannes contest the derby match that is known as the Derby de la Côte d'Azur. In 1921, the club inaugurated the Stade Municipal de Cannes and celebrated the opening by defeating Spanish club Espanyol 4–0. During the 1920s, Cannes successfully reached the semi-finals of the Coupe de France on two occasions. Led by French internationals such as Maurice Cottenet, Charles Bardot, and Raoul Dutheil, Cannes were regular participants in the latter rounds of the prestigious cup competition. In 1932, the club finally won the competition after defeating RC Roubaix 1–0 at the Stade Olympique Yves-du-Manoir in Colombes, courtesy of a goal from captain Louis Clerc.

In July 1930, the National Council of the FFF voted 128–20 in support of professionalism in French football. Cannes, along with most clubs from the south, were among the first clubs to adopt the new statute and, subsequently, became professional and were founding members of the new league. In the league's inaugural season, Cannes finished runner-up to champions Olympique Lillois after losing 4–3 in the ultimate match on 14 May 1933. Cannes had originally finished second in its group behind Antibes, but were declared champions of the group after Antibes was disqualified from the league for suspected bribery. Cannes remained in Division 1 for a decade before falling to Division 2 in the 1948–49 season after finishing last in the league table.

Cannes returned to the top division for the 1965–66 season and spent an unforgettable campaign in the league finishing second from bottom, thus returning to Division 2. It took another 20 years before the club returned to the first division for the 1987–88 season. During this time, Cannes had a young playmaker by the name of Zinedine Zidane in its ranks. In the club return to the first division, Cannes finished in 11th place. In the ensuing two seasons, Cannes remained mid-table finishing 12th and 11th, respectively. However, in the 1990–91 season, the club surprised everyone by finishing in fourth place, which gave the club qualification for the UEFA Cup. Along with Zidane, PSG loanee striker Amara Simba and the presence of experienced players like Luis Fernandez, Cannes overclassed many of their higher-rated counterparts.  Unfortunately, in the following season, with the departure of Simba and Cannes having to combine its focus on both the league and Europe, the club finished in a disastrous 19th-place position. The club also suffered elimination in Round of 32 in the UEFA Cup. The resulting relegation led to the departure of Zidane and numerous others who were being courted by Division 1 clubs.

Though the departure of Zidane and others did hurt the club, Cannes still had a solid core of players, which included veterans André Amitrano, William Ayache, Franck Durix, and Adick Koot and youngsters Johan Micoud, Patrick Vieira, David Jemmali and Laurent Macquet. The group effectively lived up to club expectations by finishing second in its group in the second division. Due to having more points than the second-place finisher in the other group, Cannes were back in Division 1. In the club's return, Cannes finished in a respectable ninth-place position for the 1994–95 season under manager Safet Sušić. The next season didn't start well, with Sušić getting sacked in September 1995. Ultimately, Cannes finished 14th that season. In the off-season heading into the 1996–97, Vieira departed the club for Italy, Durix ventured to Japan, and Ayache retired. Cannes struggled to replace the departed players and, subsequently, finished in 15th place for the season. Midway through the campaign, Micoud left the club for Bordeaux. After the season, Jammeli followed suit and also joined Bordeaux. The resulting departure of all the club's youth talent ultimately led to its downfall with Cannes finishing dead last in the 1997–98 season. Since the club's relegation in 1998, Cannes have yet to return to the first division of French football.

On 1 July 2014, Cannes were officially excluded from professional football in France after a ruling from the Direction Nationale du Contrôle de Gestion relating to the club's financial situation. For the 2015–16 season, the remnants of Cannes played in the Division of Honor, in the Mediterranean Regional League of the French football system.

Players

Current squad

Notable players 
Below are the notable former players who have represented Cannes in league and international competition since the club's foundation as a football club in 1909. To appear in the section below, a player must have played in at least 80 official matches for the club.

For a complete list of Cannes players, see :Category:AS Cannes players

Club officials

Management and coaching 
Association Sportive de Cannes Football
President: Anny Courtade
General Director: Bernard Lambourde
Head coach: Ludovic Pollet
Assistant coach: Derek Decamps

Coaching history

Honours 
Ligue 1
Runners-up (1): 1932–33
Coupe de France
Champions (1): 1931–32
USFSA League (Provence-Alpes-Côte d'Azur)
Champions (1): 1910
Coupe Gambardella
Champions (2): 1955, 1995

References

External links 

  

 
Association football clubs established in 1902
As Cannes
1902 establishments in France
Football clubs in Provence-Alpes-Côte d'Azur
Ligue 1 clubs